As of March 2021, 13 women have served or are serving as the president of a Spanish Autonomous Community (including two acting presidents) and none have served or are serving as presidents of the autonomous cities. Currently, four women are serving as regional presidents.

History 
The first woman to act as regional president was María Antonia Martínez, who served as Acting president of Murcia for almost a month after former president Andrés Hernández Ros was forced to resign. She would be later, in 1993, elected as President of the region after once again another former president, Carlos Collado, was also forced to resign.

The first woman to assume office as regional president following a regional election was Esperanza Aguirre, who was elected on November 21, 2003 by the Assembly of Madrid, also becoming the first woman to held the position since María Antonia Martínez, and she also became the first woman to resign from her position following a corruption scandal. Since then, apart from the Region of Murcia and the Community of Madrid, seven other Autonomous Communities have elected female regional Presidents after their respective regional elections.

To date, no woman has ever changed parties during her presidential term.

Demographics 
To date, only nine Autonomous Communities have elected women as regional presidents, and only Navarre has elected women from different political parties to held the position. It was also the first and to date only community where a woman followed another woman as president, and is the first and to date only community to have three women in a row serve as president. The Community of Madrid and Navarre are the communities that have elected the most women to the position, with three each.

As of 2021, a total of 9 autonomous communities have never had a woman as president. Those regions are: Asturias, the Basque Country, the Canary Islands, Cantabria, Castile and León, Catalonia, Extremadura, Galicia and the Valencian Community and the two autonomous cities of Ceuta and Melilla. Only one autonomous community (Castile and León) has never seen a major party nominate a woman in a regional election.

No women of color have been elected as regional president.

Esperanza Aguirre from the Community of Madrid has been the longest-serving female regional president, with a mandate of 8 years and 301 days while María Antonia Martínez from the Region of Murcia has been the shortest-serving female president.

From June 25 to July 1, 2015 there was a total of 5 women serving as regional presidents, making this the period with the greatest amount of women serving at the same time.

Histograph

Autonomous Communities

Autonomous cities

Timeline of women serving as presidents

See also 

 List of current presidents of the autonomous communities of Spain
 President (Autonomous communities of Spain)

Notes

References 

Articles which contain graphical timelines
Lists of Spanish politicians